is a 2011 Japanese thriller film directed by Eisuke Naitō in his directorial debut. The film follows a group of five junior high school girls led by a psychopath who decide to make their teacher have a miscarriage after hearing the news of her pregnancy.

References

External links
 

2011 films
2011 independent films
2010s Japanese-language films
Japanese thriller drama films
Japanese independent films
Japanese pregnancy films
Films about bullying
Films about school violence
Fiction about animal cruelty
Films about abortion
2011 thriller drama films
2011 drama films
Films set in Japan
2010s Japanese films